In graph theory, a panconnected graph is an undirected graph in which, for every two vertices  and , there exist paths from  to  of every possible length from the distance  up to , where  is the number of vertices in the graph. The concept of panconnectivity was introduced in 1975 by Yousef Alavi and James E. Williamson.

Panconnected graphs are necessarily pancyclic: if  is an edge, then it belongs to a cycle of every possible length, and therefore the graph contains a cycle of every possible length.
Panconnected graphs and are also a generalization of Hamiltonian-connected graphs (graphs that have a Hamiltonian path connecting every pair of vertices).

Several classes of graphs are known to be panconnected:
If every vertex in an -vertex graph has degree at least , then the graph is panconnected.
If an -vertex graph has at least  edges, then the graph is panconnected.

References

Graph families